Cocktail garnishes are decorative ornaments that add character or style to a mixed drink, most notably to cocktails.

They are used to complement and enhance the flavors in a drink by stimulating the special nerve cells in the nose and mouth

A large variety of cocktail garnishes are used. Many rum-based cocktails, especially those with fruit flavors, tend to be decorated with tropical-themed garnishes or slices of fruit. Tequila-based drinks favor limes and other citrus fruits. Gin- and vodka-based drinks tend toward garnishes with a more dignified flair (olives, onions, or possibly a citrus twist or a single maraschino cherry), unless they are variations of a fruity rum-based drink. Whiskey- and brandy-based drinks tend toward minimal garnishment, if any. Restaurant chains and hotel bars tend to use larger and more ostentatious garnishes, and neighborhood bars tend to go the other extreme.

Some garnishes are essential to completing the recipe, as in the case of the olive in the Martini, the maraschino cherries in the Queen Mary and the Manhattan, or the onion in the Gibson. Another reason for garnishes is to make cocktails more "camera ready" so that when photos are taken for the press or social media, different drinks will not look so much alike.

Common edible garnishes
Among common edible garnishes are the following:

 Bitters dashed onto the egg-white foam atop a shaken cocktail such as a whiskey sour.
 Candied ginger
 Carrot sticks
 Celery stalks (usually with leaves attached)
 Cinnamon, grated
 Cocktail olives (often stuffed with pimentos)
 Cocktail onions
Flowers
 Lemon slice, twist, or wedge
 Lime slice, twist, or wedge
Maraschino cherries
 Mint sprigs or leaves
 Nutmeg, grated
 Orange slice, twist, or wedge
 Pepper
 Pineapple slice or wedge
 Salt, coarse (applied to the rim of glasses)
 Shrimp
 Star anise
 Strawberries
 Sugar, granulated or powdered
 Watermelon wedge

Common inedible garnishes
These garnishes are purely for decoration or dramatic flair.
 Bead necklaces (especially common during Mardi Gras and Carnival)
 Candles
 Cocktail umbrellas
 Drinking straws (colorful or unusually shaped)
 Fire (see Flaming beverage)
 Flags
 Inedible flowers
 Plastic animals (attached to the rim of the glass)
 Plastic swords
 Sparklers
 Swizzle sticks

See also

 Garnish
 Harry Yee
 List of cocktails
 Tiki bar

References

External links
 
 

Alcohol-related lists
 
 Cocktail garnish